Gravelyia is a genus of Indian mygalomorph spiders in the family Nemesiidae, first described by Zeeshan A. Mirza & A. Mondal in 2018.  it contains only 3 species.

Species
, the World Spider Catalog accepted 3 species:
 Gravelyia boro (Basumatary & Brahma, 2021)  — India
 Gravelyia excavatus (Gravely, 1921) (type) — India
 Gravelyia striatus Mirza & Mondal, 2018 — India

References

External links

Mygalomorphae genera
Nemesiidae